Aouille Tseuque is a mountain of the Pennine Alps on the Swiss-Italian border. On its northern side it overlooks the Otemma Glacier.

References

External links
 Aouille Tseuque on Hikr

Mountains of the Alps
Alpine three-thousanders
Mountains of Switzerland
Mountains of Aosta Valley
Italy–Switzerland border
International mountains of Europe
Mountains of Valais